International Gymnast Magazine, often shortened to IG, is an American sports magazine about gymnastics and the first gymnastics publication.

The editor of the magazine is Paul Ziert, former Oklahoma Sooners gymnastics coach. Ziert's Oklahoma protégé, Bart Conner, 1984 Olympic Champion, is also an editor. Conner's wife, iconic Romanian Olympic Champion and first gymnast to score a perfect 10.0, Nadia Comaneci, also helps out with the editorial side of the magazine. The magazine was established in 1956. It is based out of Norman, Oklahoma.

The magazine is currently owned by former Oklahoma Sooners gymnastics coach and Stanford graduate, Paul Ziert and his company, Paul Ziert & Associates, Inc. The magazine is also in partnership with Universal Sports, NBC Sports, MSNBC and MSN.

References

External links

Monthly magazines published in the United States
Sports magazines published in the United States
Magazines established in 1956
Magazines published in Oklahoma
Norman, Oklahoma